The Leipsic River is a  river in central Delaware in the United States.

The mouth of the river on Delaware Bay is surrounded by extensive wetlands that are protected as part of Bombay Hook National Wildlife Refuge.

See also
List of Delaware rivers

References

External links
EPA: Lower Leipsic River

Rivers of Delaware
Rivers of Kent County, Delaware
Tributaries of Delaware Bay